Leptospermum namadgiense is a species of small shrub that is endemic to areas near the border between New South Wales and the Australian Capital Territory. It has silky-hairy, narrow lance-shaped to elliptical leaves, usually white flowers borne singly or in pairs on short side shoots, and fruit that falls from the plant shortly after the seeds are released.

Description
It has thin, rough bark that is shed in strips or in flaky layers on the older stems, and young stems that are softly-hairy at first. The leaves are usually covered on both surfaces by silky white hairs. There are between seven and eleven stamens.

Taxonomy and naming
Leptospermum namadgiense was first formally described in 1993 by Andrew M. Lyne in the journal Telopea from specimens he collected on Mt Scabby in 1992. The specific epithet (namadgiense) is from the name "namadgi" used by local Aboriginal people for the mountains south-west of Canberra.

Distribution and habitat

References

Flora of New South Wales
Flora of the Australian Capital Territory
namadgiense
Myrtales of Australia
Plants described in 1993